Pipestone is a rural municipality in the southwestern part of the province of Manitoba in Western Canada

The municipality is located in the unceded territory of the Dakota people in Treaty 2. The Dakota have never signed a treaty in Canada.

Communities
 Butler
 Cromer
 Ebor
 Ewart
 Linklater
 Pipestone
 Reston
 Scarth
 Sinclair
 Woodnorth

Demographics 

See also
Pipestone Creek (Saskatchewan)

References

External links
 Official website
 Manitoba Municipalities: Rural Municipality of Pipestone
 Map of Pipestone R.M. at Statcan

Pipestone